Shen Chang-huan (16 October 1913 – 2 July 1998) was a Taiwanese politician and diplomat. He is the longest-serving Minister of Foreign Affairs in Taiwan's history, in office for a cumulative total of over twelve years from 1960 to 1966 and from 1972 to 1978.

Shen was born in Suzhou, Jiangsu, in mainland China. He was educated at Yenching University in Beijing, before moving to the United States and completing a Master of Arts degree at the University of Michigan. He was a member of the Kuomintang (Chinese Nationalist Party), and from 1945 to 1948 served as Chiang Kai-shek's private secretary. He was a government spokesman from 1950 to 1953, after the retreat to Taiwan. During a lengthy career in foreign affairs, he served as Vice Minister of Foreign Affairs (1953–1959), Ambassador to Spain (1959–1960), Minister of Foreign Affairs (1960–1966), Ambassador to the Holy See (1966–1969), Ambassador to Thailand (1969–1972), and Minister of Foreign Affairs again (1972–1978). His second term as foreign minister was served under Chiang Ching-kuo, the son of Chiang Kai-shek.

Personal life
Shen's wife was the oldest daughter of Japanese-born Hong Kong filmmaker Lai Man-wai. This relationship indirectedly caused the suicide of Lai Man-wai's actor son Lai Hang in mainland China.

References

1913 births
1998 deaths
University of Michigan alumni
Politicians from Suzhou
Yenching University alumni
Ambassadors of the Republic of China
Foreign Ministers of the Republic of China
Taiwanese Ministers of Foreign Affairs
Chiang Kai-shek
Kuomintang politicians in Taiwan
Ambassadors of China to the Holy See
Ambassadors to Spain
Ambassadors to Thailand
Taiwanese people from Jiangsu